The 2006 Men's Central American and Caribbean Basketball Championship, also known as 2006 Centrobasket, was hosted in Panama City, Panama. The ATLAPA Convention Center in Panama City served as the venue for all the games.

Four teams qualified for the FIBA Americas Championship 2007 in Las Vegas, three teams qualified for the 2007 Pan American Games in Rio de Janeiro, Brazil and seven teams qualified for the 2006 Centroamerican Games in Cartagena de Indias, Colombia.

Qualification
Eight teams qualified during the qualification tournaments held in their respective zones in 2006.

Host: 
Gold Medal of Centrobasket 2004: 
Silver Medal of Centrobasket 2004: 
2 for Central America:, 
3 for the Caribbean:,

First phase

Group A

Group B

Semifinals

Final

Consolation Round

Games 13 & 14

7th & 8th Places

5th & 6th Places

Final ranking

1. 

2. 

3. 

4. 

5. 

6. 

7. 

8.

Individual awards
All-Star Team:
Point guard: 
Shooting guard: 
Small forward: 
Power forward: 
Center:

References
Official Web Site: FIBA Americas
LatinBasket
Results

Centrobasket
2006–07 in North American basketball
2006 in Central American sport
2006 in Caribbean sport
2006 in Panamanian sport
International basketball competitions hosted by Panama
July 2006 sports events in North America
Sports competitions in Panama City
21st century in Panama City